is a Japanese former professional baseball outfielder, and current forth squad hitting coach for the Fukuoka SoftBank Hawks of Nippon Professional Baseball (NPB).

He played as an outfielder for the Hiroshima Toyo Carp and the  Yokohama BayStars.

Active player era 
On November 20, 1998, Morikasa was drafted fourth overall by the Hiroshima Toyo Carp in the  1998 Nippon Professional Baseball draft.

In 1999 season, he debuted in the Central League in his rookie year, playing in 29 games.

He was active during the 2003 season, hitting two home runs in one game, and played in 117 games, the most of his career.

He played 10 seasons with the Hiroshima Toyo Carp before moving to the Yokohama BayStars for the 2009 season, where he played two seasons before retiring.

Morikasa has played in 840 games over his 12-season career, batting average .264 with 412 hits, 21 home runs, and 125 RBI.

After retirement 
After his retirement, Morikasa was appointed as the Hiroshima Toyo Carp's third squad fielding coach for the 2011 season.

He served as the third squad fielding coach and second squad hitting coach from the 2011 season through the 2022 season.

He will serve forth squad hitting coach for the Fukuoka SoftBank Hawks beginning with the 2023 season.

References

External links

 Career statistics - NPB.jp 

1976 births
Living people
Baseball people from Kanagawa Prefecture
Japanese baseball players
Nippon Professional Baseball outfielders
Hiroshima Toyo Carp players
Yokohama BayStars players
Japanese baseball coaches
Nippon Professional Baseball coaches